David Lorion (born 15 October 1964) is a French politician of Republicans (LR) who served as a member of the National Assembly from 2017 until 2022, representing Réunion's 4th constituency. On 19 June 2022, he lost in the second round to Emeline K/Bidi.

References 

French politicians
1964 births
Living people
21st-century French politicians
Deputies of the 15th National Assembly of the French Fifth Republic
The Republicans (France) politicians
Politicians of Réunion
Members of Parliament for Réunion